The 1991 Australian Grand Prix was a Formula One motor race held on 3 November 1991 at the Adelaide Street Circuit. It was the 16th and final race of the 1991 Formula One World Championship. Torrential rain resulted in the race being stopped after just 16 of the scheduled 81 laps had been completed. The official results were declared from the end of the 14th lap, two laps before the race was suspended, in line with regulations. It held the record for being the shortest Formula One World Championship race until the 2021 Belgian Grand Prix.

The race was won by Ayrton Senna, with Nigel Mansell in second position, and Gerhard Berger's third-place finish plus Senna's victory meant that the McLaren team clinched the Constructor's championship. Mansell was unable to take part in the post-race podium ceremony, following a crash at the end of the race that left him requiring hospital treatment. Because less than seventy-five percent of the scheduled race distance had been completed, only half the normal World Championship points were awarded. This was also the final Formula One race for three time World Champion Nelson Piquet. It was the 60th pole position for Ayrton Senna. It would also prove to be the final Grand Prix for Satoru Nakajima, Naoki Hattori, Alex Caffi, and Emanuele Pirro.

Pre-race
Ferrari terminated Alain Prost's contract with the team following his public criticism of them. His raceseat was taken by Gianni Morbidelli, the Ferrari test driver. After being dropped by the Jordan team two races earlier, Roberto Moreno returned to Formula One to take Morbidelli's place at Minardi. Benetton did not renew Nelson Piquet's contract with the team, and Australia would be his last Formula One race. Bertrand Gachot returned to Formula One after completing his jail sentence in Britain, replacing Éric Bernard at Larrousse, who had been injured at the previous race meeting in Japan. The Coloni team were entered for their final Grand Prix; new owner Andrea Sassetti had confirmed that the team would be reborn as Andrea Moda Formula for the following season. Williams also had a 'B'-spec version of the FW14 present, but elected not to use it in the race.

Qualifying

Pre-qualifying report
The one-hour pre-qualifying session took place in sunny and dry conditions on Thursday afternoon, instead of Friday morning to expand the race meeting to four days. The session resulted in the Brabham and Footwork teams getting their cars through to the main qualifying sessions, with Martin Brundle's Brabham three tenths of a second faster than Alex Caffi's Footwork. Mark Blundell was just four hundredths of a second behind in the other Brabham, with Michele Alboreto's Footwork just 0.002 of a second slower in fourth.

Gabriele Tarquini narrowly failed to pre-qualify for Fondmetal as his track time was limited after a left rear suspension failure on the exit of turn 11, which turned his car into the wall. It was his first failure to pre-qualify for Fondmetal in three attempts. Slowest was Naoki Hattori in the Coloni, over five seconds away from Brundle's pace. Coloni had failed to pre-qualify for every race in 1991, their last season at the highest level. It also proved to be Hattori's last opportunity at this level.

Pre-qualifying classification

Qualifying report
The sunshine continued for both the remaining qualifying sessions on the Friday and Saturday. Aguri Suzuki crashed heavily at turn 1 which contributed to his failure to qualify. His new teammate Bertrand Gachot also did not progress through qualifying. Martin Brundle, having finished in the points in the last race and pre-qualified fastest on the Friday, surprisingly struggled and failed to qualify in his last race for Brabham-Yamaha. Stefano Modena also crashed in qualifying but was unhurt and able to take the race start on Sunday, having already set a time that was sufficient for him to secure a place on the grid. McLaren managed to qualify both their cars on the front row of the grid with Senna in pole position. Nigel Mansell and Riccardo Patrese, in the two Williams-Renault cars, occupied the second row. Benetton occupied the third row with Nelson Piquet out-qualifying Michael Schumacher for the only time in the 1991 season. Gianni Morbidelli qualified in 8th position, only one place behind Jean Alesi in his first race for Ferrari. In his first race for Minardi-Ferrari, Roberto Moreno also managed to qualify 18th fastest.

Qualifying classification

Race

Race report
In the torrential rain (which had been falling since halfway through the Group A touring car support race earlier in the day), the race started mostly without incident. Riccardo Patrese lost two places at the start and emerged behind Jean Alesi's Ferrari but there were no accidents in the first few laps. However, as the race continued into lap 3 Gerhard Berger, unseen by the television cameras, ran wide which allowed Nigel Mansell to move up to second position, but rejoining in third. Mansell then proceeded to quickly close the gap to Ayrton Senna in first place. But by lap 5 the incidents began to occur which would affect Mansell's ability to pass Senna. This was because so many yellow flags were being displayed by the marshals around the extremely wet circuit. On lap six Mansell moved alongside Senna on the Brabham Straight but quickly saw a wave from a marshal, who was leaning out from the barriers, to warn of wreckage ahead. Nicola Larini's Modena-Lamborghini had crashed on the straight and was lying across the track. Mansell had to abandon his line and rejoin the racing line behind Senna, who had also had to avoid Jean Alesi's stricken Ferrari, which had also crashed yards after Larini on the other side of the road, as did Schumacher's Benetton who also spun off on the side of the road.

Pierluigi Martini's Minardi car aquaplaned on the Brabham Straight on lap 10, which sent his car straight into the right hand wall and rebounded to the other side of the track before eventually stopping out of the drivers' way. This indicated that the rain was beginning to fall even harder, and more torrential than before. On lap 14, Mauricio Gugelmin's Leyton House was involved in a heavy crash trying to pass the Tyrrell of Stefano Modena going through turn 15. He lost control in the right hand turn and hit the inside wall of the pit lane entrance at the turn 16 hairpin with such speed, he became airborne. Two track marshals suffered minor injuries from flying debris.

Riccardo Patrese was struggling with his car because a front wing, from another car, got stuck towards the front of his undertray. This was spotted by James Hunt in the BBC race commentary, although Murray Walker had suggested earlier that it was the undertray that was loose. Mansell then, as a result of the increasing downpour, spun off on the start of lap 16 on the Wakefield Road straight, before turn 3, having "instantly gone out of control" according to Mansell himself. The torrential downpour also made Michele Alboreto spin out of the race on lap 15 as well as Modena, although he continued. Nelson Piquet also spun at the high-speed Stag turn but was able to recover and he continued as well.

Gerhard Berger spun off at the end of lap 16 having just recovered from an earlier spin at the Malthouse Corner moments before. Murray Walker said that the weather was becoming worse and the rain was lashing down on the start/finish line. Just after this happened Senna drove onto the start/finish straight and gestured to the race officials, as he went past, to try to get the race stopped. Moments later, with Senna on lap 17, the race was finally stopped. By the end of lap 16 the race order actually was Senna in 1st from Piquet, Morbidelli, de Cesaris, Zanardi and Modena. However, the race officials decided to count back to lap 14 despite the 1991 ruling that early race stoppages should have been counted back one lap. This incident was similar to the controversy of the 2003 Brazilian Grand Prix, where computers finalising the race concluded the result a lap too early.

There were attempts to restart the race from the officials, who showed their determination to do so by ordering the 10-minute warning board to be displayed to the drivers and teams to indicate a race restart. But after serious protests from Senna and Riccardo Patrese (who stormed up to the race stewards to argue against a restart), the race was finally abandoned for good. Roland Bruynseraede eventually waved the red flag to indicate the stoppage to the spectators, drivers and teams. As a result, Senna was declared the race winner from Mansell and Berger.

Post-race
The podium ceremony only had Ayrton Senna and Gerhard Berger present because Nigel Mansell was sent to hospital after the injuries he sustained in his crash on lap 16. When interviewed by Jackie Stewart in the post-race press conference, Senna stated:

Senna and Berger both revealed at the press conference that they would not have started the race if this race did not determine the Constructor's Championship, as the McLaren and Williams teams both went into this race with a chance of winning the championship. When Stewart asked him if they should start a race if ever faced with those type of wet conditions in the future, Senna's reply was a firm "No, they should not start the race", though he understood the pressure that was on the officials and teams to start. He then added that the officials should not be held solely responsible as the drivers, including himself, chose to get in their cars and start the race so they should be held equally responsible.

Nigel Mansell, after being helped from his Williams-Renault commented that "everything was ok other than it was a complete joke, I mean there was debris all over the place. I've got a headache like there's no tomorrow, so I've probably had a little bit of a concussion". He also made reference to the fact that "there was a truck down the straight" as well as four cars and, as a result, the race should have had 10 laps to be stopped.

With less than seventy-five percent of the race distance being completed, half the usual world championship points were awarded, the first time this had happened in Formula One since the wet 1984 Monaco Grand Prix had been stopped just before half distance. Senna and Berger's result was enough for McLaren to win the 1991 World Constructors Championship by 14 points over Williams. This was McLaren's seventh constructors championship, and their fourth and last championship won with engine partners Honda.

Race classification

Championship standings after the race
 Bold text indicates World Champions.

Drivers'  Championship standings

Constructors'   Championship standings

 Note:         Only the top five positions are included for both sets of standings.

References

Grand Prix
Australian Grand Prix
Australian Grand Prix
Motorsport in Adelaide
Australian Grand Prix